Tarbiat-e Mo'allem railway station (Persian:ايستگاه راه آهن تربیت معلم, Istgah-e Rah Ahan-e Tarbiat-e Mo'allem) is located on northern edge of Azarshahr, and on the southern edge of Mamqan, East Azerbaijan Province. The station is owned by IRI Railway. The station serves primarily the students, staff, and faculty Azarbaijan Shahid Madani University, and is named after the university.

References

External links

Railway stations in Iran